Aryaman Birla (born 9 July 1997) is an Indian cricketer and businessman. In 2023, he was appointed as one of the directors of Aditya Birla Fashion and Retail.

Early life and background 
He is son of Kumar Mangalam Birla, a billionaire-industrialist and the chairman of the Aditya Birla Group and a member of the Birla family. In 2018, he was pursuing a commerce degree through distance learning from the University of Mumbai.

Career 
He made his first-class debut for Madhya Pradesh in the 2017–18 Ranji Trophy on 25 November 2017. In January 2018, he was bought by the Rajasthan Royals in the 2018 IPL auction. In November 2018, he scored his maiden century in first-class cricket. In 2019, he took a sabbatical from cricket owing to mental health problems. He was released by the Rajasthan Royals ahead of the 2020 IPL auction.

See also
 Aryaman Vikram Birla Institute of Learning

References

External links
 

1997 births
Living people
Indian cricketers
Cricketers from Mumbai
Madhya Pradesh cricketers
University of Mumbai alumni
Birla family